Siquirres is a canton in the Limón province of Costa Rica. The head city is in Siquirres district.

History 
Siquirres was created on 19 September 1911 by decree 11.

Geography 
Siquirres has an area of  km² and a mean elevation of  metres.

The canton touches the Caribbean coast between the mouths of the Pacuare River to the southeast and the Parismina River to the northwest. It encompasses territory in a southwest direction, between the Madre de Dios River on the southeast side and the Destierro River on the northwest, as far as the southernmost portion of the Cordillera Central.

The area is drained by the rivers Reventazón, Parismina, Pacuare River, Madre de Dios, Matina River and Siquirres River.

Climate
The climate is warm, wet with temperatures between 25 and 26 Degrees Celsius.

Districts 
The canton of Siquirres is subdivided into the following districts:
 Siquirres
 Pacuarito
 Florida
 Germania
 Cairo
 Alegría
 Reventazón

Demographics 

For the 2011 census, Siquirres had a population of  inhabitants.

Transportation

Road transportation 
The canton is covered by the following road routes:

Tourism
Areas of interest to tourists include Pacuare Tourist Center, Barra del Parismina, Barra del Pacuare and Laguna Madre de Dios.

Commerce
Agriculture products include: Banana, cacao, corn, coconut, plantain, rice, cassava, soursop, macadamia, nuts, pasión fruit and ginger. Fishing and cattle are also important.

References 

Cantons of Limón Province
Populated places in Limón Province